Plastic Cement may refer to:

Cement, in the US where it refers to certain formulations of Masonry Cement
Dichloromethane, used to solvent weld some thermoplastics including acrylic
Butanone, model cement is a thick mixture with polystyrene
Tetrahydrofuran, the main solvent in PVC cement

See also 
List of glues
Plastic welding